Haus Tambaran is a Tok Pisin phrase which describes a type of traditional ancestral worship house in the East Sepik region of Papua New Guinea. The most visually recognizable forms are from the Maprik area, with a tall and elaborately decorated front entrance wall where the ridge pole slopes down low toward the back of the building and the roof follows this decline and often continues all the way to the ground. The Sepik people are renowned for their superb artistic ability in painting and carving, which is often exhibited in these religious structures.

The front entrance of the modern National Parliament (which is sometimes referred to informally as Haus Tambaran) building in Port Moresby is modelled on traditional haus tambaran architecture.  It can be viewed on Google Earth at Latitude: 9°25'41.69"S, Longitude: 147°11'33.45"E, and is depicted on the Papua New Guinea 50 Kina note. The High Commission of Papua New Guinea in Canberra, Australia, is also influenced by haus tambaran.

The tambaran culture
The male-dominated tambaran or tambaram culture uses the haus tambaran as a meeting-house and site for rituals and initiations. It is also used in worship for the yam cult, the yam being the staple food for the Sepik people. The women serve primarily as preparers of feasts, outsiders, and spectators. The giant spirit, called Nggwal or Ngwalndu among the Abelam and Southern Arapesh peoples, is personified as noises that can be heard coming from the haus tambaran. Nggwal is the primary ancestor deity, though other cultural heroes are also often depicted in cultural and sacred arts. Ngwalndu are large, flat painted faces that line the inside of the structure. Though they are said to be representations of ancestral spirits, they can also be seen as stylized women's bodies. However, it is important to note that painting is a sacred activity for the Sepik people, and the paintings of the Sepik people are taken very seriously.

Further reading 

 Notes on Nggwal
 Tuzin, Donald F. (1980-01-01). The Voice of the Tambaran: Truth and Illusion in Ilahita Arapesh Religion. University of California Press. .

References of PNG  tradition backwards 

Religious buildings and structures in Papua New Guinea
Papua New Guinean culture